Alice Persons (born April 23, 1952) is an American poet.

She was born in Waltham, Massachusetts, grew up on Army bases, and graduated from high school in Arlington, Virginia. She earned a B.A. and an M.A. in English from the University of Oregon. In 1983 she moved to Portland, Maine to attend law school and earned a J.D. from the University of Maine School of Law.

Persons has experience working as a secretary, waitress, bartender, and copy editor. She has experience instructing English at universities, community colleges, and high schools. She has been a part-time instructor of business law at the University of Southern Maine in Portland since 1984.

She began writing poetry and publishing in small literary journals in the early 1980s. During and after law school, she took a long hiatus from writing. Her first poetry chapbook was Be Careful What You Wish For, published in 2003. The second, Never Say Never, came out in 2004. In 2007 her third chapbook was published, Don't Be A Stranger. She received a Pushcart Prize nomination, and eight of her poems have been featured on The Writer's Almanac on National Public Radio.  She has published poems in various paper and online journals. Her work has been anthologized in A Sense of Place, Grace Notes, InfiniTea, and the Moon Pie Press anthologies. (See the Sheltering Pines Press website at www.shelteringpinespress.com)

In 2003, she co-founded Moon Pie Press, a small poetry press, with Nancy A. Henry, and  since 2006 has continued the press alone.  The press has published 40 books of poetry from poets all over the U.S.

She lives in Westbrook, Maine, with 3 cats and a dog, and volunteers for animal welfare organizations. She also volunteers for Port Veritas, a performance organization based in Portland, Maine. She has served as a poetry judge and guest editor for several contests and anthologies.

References

External links
 MoonPiePress.com
 "Stealing Lilacs", a poem by Alice at Writersalmanac.org

1952 births
Living people
American women poets
Chapbook writers
21st-century American women